Bonaventura is a surname. Notable people with the surname include:

 Andrea Bonaventura (born 1986), professional Canadian football linebacker
 Andrea Giacinto Bonaventura Longhin O.F.M.Cap. (1863–1936), Italian Roman Catholic prelate who served as Bishop of Treviso
 Emilio Bonaventura Altieri (1590–1676), Italian noble and future Pope Clement X
 Braniff Bonaventure, American football player
 Federico Bonaventura (1555–1602), Italian statesman and natural philosopher
 Giacomo Bonaventura, Italian football player
 Lorenzo di Bonaventura, American film producer
 Pietro Bonaventura (died 1653), Roman Catholic prelate who served as Bishop of Cesena
 Romano Bonaventura (1216–1243), Cardinal deacon of Sant'Angelo in Pescheria and cardinal-legate to the court of France.
 Segna di Bonaventura, Italian painter

See also 

 Bonaventura (disambiguation)